Trevor Graves Guyton (born January 9, 1990) is a former American football defensive tackle and coach. He currently serves as a Defensive Graduate Assistant at the University of Southern California. He was selected in the seventh round, 219th overall, by the Vikings in the 2012 NFL Draft. He played college football at California.

College career
He played at California.

Professional career

Minnesota Vikings
He was drafted in the seventh round, 219th overall, by the Minnesota Vikings in the 2012 NFL Draft.  On August 31, 2012 as the Vikings reduced their roster down to league maximum of 53 players, he was released.

Saskatchewan Roughriders
Guyton signed with the Saskatchewan Roughriders on February 25, 2014.

References

External links
 California profile
 Saskatchewan Roughriders profile 
 USC profile 

1990 births
Living people
American football defensive ends
American football defensive tackles
American players of Canadian football
Canadian football defensive linemen
California Golden Bears football players
Minnesota Vikings players
Saskatchewan Roughriders players
Sportspeople from King County, Washington
Players of Canadian football from Philadelphia
People from Woodinville, Washington
Players of American football from Washington (state)
Players of American football from Philadelphia